Theatre of War or Theater of War may refer to:

Theater (warfare), a military term for an area where an armed conflict takes place
Theater War, a war between Denmark-Norway and Sweden in 1788-1789
Theater of War (album), a 2001 music album by the band Jacob's Dream
Theater of War (film), a 2008 documentary film by director John Walter
Theatre of War (novel), a 1994 Doctor Who novel by Justin Richards
Theatre of War (Three-Sixty), a 1992 computer game by Three-Sixty Pacific
Theatre of War (video game), a 2007 computer game by 1C Company
War of the Theatres, a rivalry between playwrights Ben Johnson, John Marston, and Thomas Dekker from 1599 to 1602
Theatre of War Project,  community-specific, theater-based projects that address public health and social issues